Glycomyces endophyticus is an endophytic bacterium from the genus of Glycomyces which has been isolated from the roots of the plant Carex baccans from Xishuangbanna in China.

References 

Actinomycetia
Bacteria described in 2008